Radio Pakistan serves as the national public broadcaster for radio in Pakistan. Although some local stations predate Radio Pakistan's founding, it is the oldest existing broadcasting network in Pakistan. The network was established on 14 August 1947, following Pakistan's independence from Britain. Radio Pakistan services include AM news services and FM 101 (music) and FM 93.

History 
Radio Pakistan was originally known as the Pakistan Broadcasting Service at the time of its inception on 14 August 1947. It had the honour of publicly announcing Pakistan's independence from Britain on 13 August 1947 at 11:59 pm. Mustafa Ali Hamdani made the announcement from Lahore in Urdu and English, while Abdullah Jan Maghmoom made the announcement from Peshawar in Pashto.

The announcement was heard as follows:

The English translation of this announcement is as follows:

Greetings
Pakistan Broadcasting Service. We are speaking from Lahore. The night between the thirteenth and fourteenth of August, year forty-seven. It is twelve o'clock. Dawn of Freedom.

Radio Pakistan broadcasts are in 34 languages: Urdu, Punjabi, Sindhi, Balochi, Seraiki, Potowari, Pashto, Hindko, Kohistani, Khowar, Kashmiri, Gojri, Burushaski, Balti, Shina, Wakhi, Hazargi, Brahvi, English, Chinese, Dari, Persian, Hindi, Gujarati, Tamil, Sinhala, Nepali, Russian, Turkish, Arabic, and Bengali.

According to one of the pioneers of Radio Pakistan, Agha Nasir (9 February 1937 – 12 July 2016), three radio stations at Dhaka (established in 1939), Lahore (1937) and Peshawar Radio Station (1935) existed at the time of independence of Pakistan on 14 August 1947. There was no radio station in the capital of Pakistan, Karachi in 1947. On a high priority basis, a major program of expansion saw new stations opened at Karachi and Rawalpindi in 1948, and a new broadcasting house at Karachi in 1950. This was followed by new stations at Hyderabad (1951), Quetta (1956), a second station at Rawalpindi (1960) and a Receiving Centre at Peshawar (1960). In 1970, training facilities were opened in Islamabad and a station opened at Multan.

A 1973 law, signed by Zulfikar Ali Bhutto (President and later Prime minister) regulated Pakistan Broadcasting Corporation (PBC) as "to publish, circulate, distribute and regulate (reliable and trusted) news and information in any part of the world in any manner that may be deemed fit".

Its one core mission states: "education, news and information to be brought to public awareness the whole range of significant activity.". It was converted into Pakistan Broadcasting Corporation on 20 December 1972 as a statutory body governed by the Board of Directors and Director General. The Radio Pakistan World Service was established on 21 April 1973. The service reached the remotest parts of Pakistan with stations at Gilgit (1977) and Skardu (1977) in the far north and Turbat (1981) in the far southwest. From 1981 to 1982 stations and transmitters were also established at Dera Ismail Khan, Khuzdar and Faisalabad. Radio Pakistan opened a new broadcasting house in Khairpur on 7 May 1986, followed by relay stations in 1989 at Sibi and on 21 March 1991 in Abbottabad.

The remoter parts of the country began to receive coverage with new stations opened in the 1990s at Chitral, Loralai and Zhob. In 1997, the Federal Minister of Information inaugurated the computerisation of the PBC news processing system and availability of the news bulletins on the Internet in text and audio form. FM 101 Channel of PBC was launched on 1 October 1998 having stations at Islamabad, Lahore and Karachi and now this channel have nine stations throughout Pakistan and is the biggest FM Radio network of Pakistan. In October 1998, Radio Pakistan started FM transmission and over the period 2002–2005, new FM stations were opened at Islamabad, Gwadar, Mianwali, Sargodha, Kohat, Bannu and Mithi.

In the last two and a half years, three new networks have been launched by PBC. On 28 August 2008, PBC launched National Broadcasting Service (NBS) the first dedicated Current Affairs Channel. It is a combination of 5 (100 KW) AM transmitters permanently linked together to broadcast a single national program beamed across Pakistan. Islamabad, Peshawar, Lahore, Quetta and Karachi are the main stations generating the national programming. It is a 17 hours programming on major national and international issues, target audience and literary and cultural programs. PBC launched a new Community FM channel after February 2009 Station Directors Conference. The network is called FM-93 Network with 22 stations across Pakistan. Gilgit, Muzaffarabad, Mirpur, Abbottabad, Chitral, Bannu, Kohat, Dera Ismail Khan, Sargodha, Mianwali, Faisalabad, Lahore, Multan, Larkana, Khairpur, Bhit Shah, Hyderabad, Mithi, Karachi and Gwadar transmit the FM 93 network. On 14 November, PBC launched its first English Music Channel in Islamabad called Planet 94. The network operates on FM 94. The second and third stations of the English channel are soon to start their transmissions from Lahore and Karachi.

Pakistan Broadcasting Corporation

The Pakistan Broadcasting Corporation; also known as Voice of Pakistan, is a Pakistani public service broadcaster. It was started as Radio Pakistan but on  December 20‚ 1972 it was changed to a statutory body governed by the Board of Directors and the Director General. Radio services include Radio Pakistan and television operations (Pakistan Television Corporation) include PTV Bolan, PTV Global, PTV Home, PTV National, PTV News, PTV Sports and PTV World. The PBC also operates television services for Azad Jammu & Kashmir under AJK TV. Radio and television are broadcast through satellite, cable, FM, AM, and shortwave radio frequencies. See also Pakistan Television Corporation.

Select programming is also available through WRN.

Radio Pakistan and Pakistan Television offers programming in Urdu and English on its national radio and television broadcasts, while offering programming in 23 different regional languages on its domestic radio service and channels. Its external services are broadcast eight hours daily in 10 different foreign languages, covering the Middle East, Central Asia, South Asia, the Far East Asia and parts of Eastern Europe. PBC employs commercial advertising to supplement its federal funding on its television broadcasts. The radio service employed commercials from its inception.

Mandate
The Pakistan Broadcasting Corporation Act, 1973. was enacted...
...to provide for the establishment of a broadcasting corporation, to ensure effective operation and growth of broadcasting as a function-oriented public service medium, general improvement in the quality of programmes, speedy, implementation of projects and better utilisation of talent, and for matters connected therewith;

The functions of the corporation as outlined in the act are:
 to be made available throughout Pakistan for the purposes of disseminating information, education and entertainment,
 to reflect Pakistan and its regions to national and regional audiences,
 to actively contribute to the flow and exchange of cultural expression and Islamic Ideology,
 to be in all languages, reflecting the different needs and circumstances of each official language community,
 to strive for national unity, principles of democracy, freedom, equality, tolerance and social justice.

Management
In accordance with the act, a board of directors is responsible for the management of the Pakistan Broadcasting Corporation; the general management is in the hands of a director general, who is appointed by the Government of Pakistan. In total, the board is made up of 12 members, including the director general.

Secretary Ministry of Information, Broadcasting & National Heritage
One eminent media personality from each province appointed by the Government of Pakistan (4).
Additional Foreign Secretary
Additional Secretary Finance
Director General, ISPR
Managing Director, PTVC
Director General, PBC
Representative of the Interior Division

Channels

News & Current Affairs Channel  
News and Current Affairs Channel was launched by Pakistan Broadcasting Corporation in November 2000 and was converted into National Broadcasting Service in 2008. It broadcasts 13 hours of programmes from 8:00 AM to 9:00 PM (PKT) daily from Islamabad and 8 hours daily from the  Provincial Headquarters.
Frequencies:
 Islamabad – 1152 kHz
 Lahore – 1332 kHz
 Karachi – 639 kHz
 Quetta – 756 kHz
 Peshawar  	1170 kHz
 3999.75 MHz on Satellite Pak Sat1R

FM 107 (Apna Karachi) 

FM-107 / Ballay Ballay FM (Roshan Media) was established in 2002

Other
FM 107 (Apna Karachi)
Ballay Ballay FM (Roshan Media)
FM 93
Central Production Unit
Dhanak FM 94

See also
 List of radio channels in Pakistan
 List of television channels in Pakistan
 Pakistan Television
 FM 101

References

External links 
 Radio Pakistan
 Official PBC Radio Pakistan Site 
 Fire destroys 14 studios of Radio Pakistan – DAWN.com

1947 establishments in Pakistan
Radio networks
Radio stations in Pakistan
Government-owned companies of Pakistan
State media
Multilingual broadcasters
Public broadcasting in Pakistan
Radio stations established in 1947
Internet radio in Pakistan
Ministry of Information and Broadcasting (Pakistan)